Wehazit Kidane (born 8 January 1992) is a road cyclist from Eritrea. She became Eritrean national road race and time trial champion in 2013 and 2014. She also rode in the women's road race at the 2016 UCI Road World Championships, finishing in 96th place.

Major results

2011
 African Road Championships
4th Time trial
5th Road race
2013
 National Road Championships
1st  Time trial
1st  Road race
 African Road Championships
2nd  Team time trial
2nd  Time trial
3rd  Road race
2014
 National Road Championships
1st  Time trial
1st  Road race
2015
 African Games
2nd  Time trial
10th Road race
 3rd  Team time trial, African Road Championships
2016
 African Road Championships
3rd  Team time trial
6th Road race
2017
 African Road Championships
1st  Team time trial
5th Time trial
6th Road race
 3rd Time trial, National Road Championships
2018
 African Road Championships
2nd  Team time trial
6th Road race

References

External links
 

1992 births
Living people
Eritrean female cyclists
Place of birth missing (living people)
African Games silver medalists for Eritrea
African Games medalists in cycling
Competitors at the 2015 African Games